The 1946 Milan–San Remo was the 37th edition of the Milan–San Remo cycle race and was held on 19 March 1946. The race started in Milan and finished in San Remo. The race was won by Fausto Coppi of the Bianchi team.

General classification

References

1946
1946 in road cycling
1946 in Italian sport
March 1946 sports events in Europe